The Arabic language family is divided into several categories: Old Arabic, the literary varieties, and the modern vernaculars. 

The genealogical position of Arabic within the group of the Semitic languages has long been a problem.

Views on Arabic classification 
Semitic languages were confined in a relatively small geographic area (Greater Syria, Mesopotamia and the Arabian desert) and often spoken in contiguous regions. Permanent contacts between the speakers of these languages facilitated borrowing between them. Borrowing disrupts historical processes of change and makes it difficult to reconstruct the genealogy of languages.

In the traditional classification of the Semitic languages, Arabic was in the Southwest Semitic group, based on some affinities with Modern South Arabian and Geʽez.

Most scholars reject the Southwest Semitic subgrouping because it is not supported by any innovations and because shared features with South Arabian and Ethiopian were only due to areal diffusion.

In 1976, linguist Robert Hetzron classified Arabic languages as a Central Semitic language:

John Huehnergard, Aaron D. Rubin, and other scholars suggested subsequent modifications to Hetzron's model:

However, several scholars, such as Giovanni Garbini, consider that the historical–genetic interpretation is not a satisfactory way of representing the development of the Semitic languages (contrary to Indo-European languages, which spread over a wide area and were usually isolated from each other). Edward Ullendorff even thinks it is impossible to establish any genetic hierarchy between Semitic languages. These scholars prefer a purely typological–geographical approach without any claim to a historical derivation.

For instance, in Garbini's view, the Syrian Desert was the core area of the Semitic languages where innovations came from. This region had contacts between sedentary settlements—on the desert fringe—and nomads from the desert. Some nomads joined settlements, while some settlers became isolated nomads ("Bedouinisation"). According to Garbini, this constant alternation explains how innovations spread from Syria into other areas. Isolated nomads progressively spread southwards and reached South Arabia, where the South Arabian language was spoken. They established linguistic contacts back and forth between Syria and South Arabia and their languages. That is why Garbini considers that Arabic does not belong exclusively to either the Northwest Semitic languages (Aramaic, Phoenician, Hebrew, etc.) or the South Semitic languages (Modern South Arabian, Geʽez, etc.) but that it was affected by innovations in both groups.

There is still no consensus regarding the exact position of Arabic within Semitic languages. The only consensus among scholars is that Arabic varieties exhibit common features with both the South (South Arabian, Ethiopic) and the North (Canaanite, Aramaic) Semitic languages, and that it also contains unique innovations.

There is no consensus among scholars whether Arabic diglossia (between Classical Arabic, also called "Old Arabic" and Arabic vernaculars, also called "New Arabic" or "Neo-Arabic") was the result of the Islamic conquests and due to the influence of non-Arabic languages or whether it was already the natural state in 7th-century Arabia (which means that both types coexisted in the pre-Islamic period).

Modern spoken Arabic varieties 
According to Dutch linguist Kees Versteegh, modern vernaculars (also called dialects, colloquial varieties or spoken Arabic varieties) are classified as follows:
 Peninsular
 North-east Arabian:
 ʿAnazī: including Kuwaiti Arabic, Bahrain Sunnī Arabic and Gulf Arabic
 Šammar: including some Bedouin dialects in Iraq
 Syro-Mesopotamian Bedouin: including the Bedouin dialects of North Israel and Jordan, and the Dawāġrah dialect
 South(-west) Arabian: Yemeni Arabic (including Sanʽani Arabic, Hadhrami Arabic and Taʽizzi-Adeni Arabic), Shiʿite Baḥārna and Omani Arabic
 Ḥijāzī (West Arabian): Bedouin dialects of the Hejaz and the Tihamah. Includes Mecca and Medina.
 Northwest Arabian: Negev, Sinai, southern Jordan, eastern coast of the Gulf of Aqaba and "some regions in north-western Saudi Arabia"
 Syro-Lebanese
 Lebanese/Central Syrian: including all Lebanese dialects, Damascus Arabic, Druze Arabic, and Çukurova Arabic. Versteegh notes that Cypriot Arabic is usually included in this group although it also has North Mesopotamian Arabic (qeltu) features.
 North Syrian: including Aleppo Arabic
 Palestinian/Jordanian:
 Palestinian urban (madani)
 Central Palestinian rural (fellahi)
 South Palestinian rural and Jordanian, including the Hauran
 Greater Mesopotamian
 qǝltu
 Tigris
 Jewish Baghdadi and Christian Baghdadi
 Euphrates
 Anatolian
 Central Asian Arabic
 Uzbekistan Arabic
 gilit
 Muslim Baghdadi
 Urban Khuzestani
 Egyptian–Sudanese
 Chad-Sudan
 Chadian Arabic
 Bagirmi: Nigeria, Cameroon, and part of Chad
 Urban dialects of Chad, including N’Djamena and Abbéché
 Sudanese Arabic
 Juba Arabic
 Nubi Arabic
 Egyptian proper
 Nile Delta
 Eastern Delta (Šarqiyya)
 Western Delta
 Cairene Arabic
 Middle Egypt: Giza to Asyut
 Upper Egyptian
 Between Asyut and Nag Hammadi
 Between Nag Hammadi and Qena
 Between Qena and Luxor
 Between Luxor and Esna
 Maghrebi
 Pre-Hilālī: all urban
 Eastern pre-Hilālī: Libya, Tunisia (including Judeo-Tunisian), eastern Algeria
 Western pre-Hilālī: western Algeria and Morocco
 Maltese
 Andalusian Arabic (extinct)
 Hilālī: Bedouin dialects of North Africa
 Sulaym: Libyan Arabic and southern Tunisia
 Eastern Hilāl: central Tunisia and eastern Algeria
 Central Hilāl: south and central Algeria, especially areas bordering the Sahara
 Maʿqil: western Algeria and Moroccan plains
 Hassaniya

See also 
 Arab (disambiguation)
 Etymology of Arab

Notes

References

Sources 
 
 Cantineau, Jean (1955).  "La dialectologie arabe", Orbis 4:149–169.
 
 </ref>
 Kaye, Alan S., & Judith Rosenhouse (1997).  "Arabic Dialects and Maltese", The Semitic Languages. Ed. Robert Hetzron.  New York:  Routledge.  Pages 263–311.
 
 
 Scagliarini, F.,  (1999). "The Dedanitic inscriptions from Jabal 'Ikma in north-western Hejaz" Proceedings of the Seminar for Arabian Studies 29, 143–150  
 
 

 
Central Semitic languages
Arabic